Kab Mere Kehlaoge is a Pakistani television soap opera which aired on ARY Digital.
Apart from some actors the serial has introduces fresh cast. First episode was aired on 26 December 2017.

Cast
Maryam Fatima as Ujala
Danial Afzal Khan
Yashma Gill
Adnan Saeed as Kashif
Javeria Ajmal
Anita Camphor
Mohsin Gillani
Naeema Garaj
Rubina Arif as Kulsoom	
Fareeda Shabbir as Aneeqa's mother
Asma Shiraz as Aneeqa
Tasneem Ansari
Naeem Malik as Qadeer
Saman Abid as Asma
Asad Chaudary

Awards and nominations

References

Pakistani television soap operas
Urdu-language television shows
Pakistani drama television series
2017 Pakistani television series debuts
2018 Pakistani television series endings
ARY Digital original programming